Aleksey Tumakov (born 28 August 1983 in Vyborg) is a Russian Paralympic footballer who won a silver medal at the 2008 Summer Paralympic Games in China.

References

External links
 

1983 births
Living people
Paralympic 7-a-side football players of Russia
Paralympic silver medalists for Russia
Paralympic medalists in football 7-a-side
7-a-side footballers at the 2008 Summer Paralympics
Medalists at the 2008 Summer Paralympics
Sportspeople from Vyborg
21st-century Russian people